Crescent City Orchestra was a semi-professional symphonic jazz orchestra  in New Orleans, United States

References

Musical groups from New Orleans